.300 may refer to:
.300 AAC Blackout, rifle cartridge
.300 Winchester Magnum, rifle cartridge
.300 Remington Ultra Magnum, rifle cartridge
.300 Winchester Short Magnum, rifle cartridge
.300 Whisper, subsonic rifle cartridge
.300 Lapua Magnum, rifle cartridge
.300 Savage, rifle cartridge
.300 Weatherby Magnum, rifle cartridge
.300 Norma Magnum, rifle cartridge
.300 H&H Magnum, rifle cartridge
.300 Remington Short Action Ultra Magnum, rifle cartridge
.300 Rook, obsolete rifle cartridge
.300 Sherwood, obsolete rifle cartridge
.300 Ruger Compact Magnum, rifle cartridge
.300, a significant batting average in baseball